Artistic swimming (formally synchronized swimming) at the 2022 World Aquatics Championships was held between 17 and 25 June 2022.

Schedule
Ten events were held.

All time are local (UTC+2).

Medal summary

Medal table

Medalists

References

External links
Official website

 
Swimming
Synchronised swimming at the World Aquatics Championships
Swimming competitions in Hungary
Synchronised swimming in Hungary
2022 in synchronized swimming